Hellwigia elegans is a species of ichneumon wasps.

References 

Insects described in 1823
Campopleginae